The 2018 Jersey Flegg Cup season was the 48th season of the under-20 competition and the first since 2007. The competition, administered by the New South Wales Rugby League, replaced the National Rugby League's National Youth Competition, and mirrored the draw and structure of its senior counterpart, the Intrust Super Premiership.

The Cronulla-Sutherland Sharks defeated the Penrith Panthers in the Grand Final, winning their first Jersey Flegg Cup premiership.

Teams
The 2018 season featured 12 teams, nine based in Sydney, one in Newcastle, one in Wollongong and one in Auckland. 10 NRL clubs fielded a side in the competition, while two others, the Canberra Raiders and South Sydney Rabbitohs, fielded a side through their Intrust Super Premiership affiliated club.

Regular season

Bold – Opposition's Home game
X – Bye
Opponent for round listed above margin

Ladder

Final series

Grand Final

Player statistics
The following statistics are correct as of the conclusion of Round 24.

Leading try scorers

Leading point scorers

References

2018 in Australian rugby league